Sandringham House is a country house in the parish of Sandringham, Norfolk, England. It is one of the royal residences of Charles III, whose grandfather, George VI, and great-grandfather, George V, both died there. The house stands in a  estate in the Norfolk Coast Area of Outstanding Natural Beauty. The house is listed as Grade II* and the landscaped gardens, park and woodlands are on the National Register of Historic Parks and Gardens.

The site has been occupied since Elizabethan times, when a large manor house was constructed. This was replaced in 1771 by a Georgian mansion for the owners, the Hoste Henleys. In 1836 Sandringham was bought by John Motteux, a London merchant, who already owned property in Norfolk and Surrey. Motteux had no direct heir, and on his death in 1843, his entire estate was left to Charles Spencer Cowper, the son of Motteux's close friend Emily Temple, Viscountess Palmerston. Cowper sold the Norfolk and the Surrey estates and embarked on rebuilding at Sandringham. He led an extravagant life, and by the early 1860s, the estate was mortgaged and he and his wife spent most of their time on the Continent.

In 1862 Sandringham and just under 8,000 acres of land were purchased for £220,000 for Albert Edward, Prince of Wales, later Edward VII, as a country home for him and his future wife, Princess Alexandra of Denmark. Between 1870 and 1900, the house was almost completely rebuilt in a style described by Pevsner as "frenetic Jacobean". Albert Edward also developed the estate, creating one of the finest shoots in England. Following his death in 1910, the estate passed to Edward's son and heir, George V, who described the house as "dear old Sandringham, the place I love better than anywhere else in the world". It was the setting for the first Christmas broadcast in 1932. George died at the house on 20 January 1936. The estate passed to his son Edward VIII and, at his abdication, as the private property of the monarch, it was purchased by Edward's brother, George VI. George was as devoted to the house as his father, writing to his mother Queen Mary, "I have always been so happy here and I love the place". He died at Sandringham on 6 February 1952.

On the King's death, Sandringham passed to his daughter Elizabeth II. The Queen spent about two months each winter on the Sandringham Estate, including the anniversary of her father's death and of her own accession in early February. In 1957, she broadcast her first televised Christmas message from Sandringham. In the 1960s, plans were drawn up to demolish the house and replace it with a modern building, but these were not carried out. In 1977, to mark her Silver Jubilee, the Queen opened the house and grounds to the public for the first time. Unlike the royal palaces owned by the Crown, such as Buckingham Palace, Holyrood Palace and Windsor Castle, Sandringham (along with Balmoral Castle in Scotland) is owned personally by the monarch. In 2022, following the Queen's death, Sandringham passed to her son Charles III.

History

Early history

Sandringham is recorded in the Domesday Book as "sant-Dersingham" (the sandy part of Dersingham) and the land was awarded to a Norman knight, Robert Fitz-Corbun after the Conquest. The local antiquarian Claude Messent, in his study The Architecture on the Royal Estate of Sandringham, records the discovery of evidence of the pavements of a Roman villa near Appleton farm. In the 15th century it was held by Anthony Woodville, Lord Scales, brother-in-law to Edward IV. In the Elizabethan era a manor was built on the site of the present house, which, by the 18th century, came into the possession of the Hoste Henley family, descendants of Dutch refugees. In 1771 Cornish Henley cleared the site to build a Georgian mansion, Sandringham Hall. In 1834, Henry Hoste Henley died without issue, and the estate was bought at auction by John Motteux, a London merchant. Motteux was also without heirs and bequeathed Sandringham, together with another Norfolk estate and a property in Surrey, to the third son of his close friend, Emily Lamb, the wife of Lord Palmerston. At the time of his inheritance in 1843, Charles Spencer Cowper was a bachelor diplomat, resident in Paris. On succeeding to Motteux's estates, he sold the other properties and based himself at Sandringham. He undertook extensions to the hall, employing Samuel Sanders Teulon to add an elaborate porch and conservatory. Cowper's style of living was extravagant—he and his wife spent much of their time on the Continent—and within 10 years the estate was mortgaged for £89,000. The death of their only child, Mary Harriette, from cholera in 1854 led the couple to spend even more time abroad, mainly in Paris, and by the early 1860s Cowper was keen to sell the estate.

Edward VII
In 1861 Queen Victoria's eldest son and heir, Albert Edward, was approaching his twentieth birthday. Edward's dissipated lifestyle had been disappointing to his parents, and his father, Prince Albert, thought that marriage and the purchase of a suitable establishment were necessary to ground the prince in country life and pursuits and lessen the influence of the "Marlborough House set" with which he was involved. Albert had his staff investigate 18 possible country estates that might be suitable, including Newstead Abbey in Nottinghamshire and Houghton Hall in Norfolk. The need to act quickly was reinforced by the Nellie Clifden affair, when Edward's fellow officers smuggled the actress into his quarters. The possibility of a scandal was deeply concerning to his parents. Sandringham Hall was on the list of the estates considered, and a personal recommendation to the Prince Consort from the prime minister Lord Palmerston, stepfather to the owner, swayed Prince Albert. Negotiations were only slightly delayed by Albert's death in December 1861—his widow declared, "His wishes – his plans – about everything are to be my law". Edward visited in February 1862, and a sale was agreed for the house and just under 8,000 acres of land, which was finalised that October. Queen Victoria only twice visited the house she had paid for. Over the course of the next forty years, and with considerable expenditure, Edward was to create a house and country estate that his friend Charles Carington called "the most comfortable in England".

The price paid for Sandringham, £220,000, has been described as "exorbitant". This is questioned by Helen Walch, author of the estate's recent (2012) history, who shows the detailed analysis undertaken by the Prince Consort's advisers and suggests that the cost was reasonable. However, the house was soon found to be too small to accommodate the Prince of Wales's establishment following his marriage in March 1863 and the many guests he wished to entertain. In 1865, two years after moving in, the prince commissioned A. J. Humbert to raze the original hall and create a much larger building. Humbert was an architect favoured by the royal family—"for no good reason", according to the architectural historian Mark Girouard—and had previously undertaken work for Queen Victoria at Osborne House and at Frogmore House. The new red-brick house was complete by late 1870; the only element of the original house of the Henley Hostes and the Cowpers that was retained was the elaborate conservatory designed by Teulon in the 1830s. Edward had this room converted into a billiard room. A plaque in the entrance hall records that "This house was built by Albert Edward Prince of Wales and Alexandra his wife in the year of our Lord 1870". The building was entered through a large porte-cochère straight into the main living room (the saloon), an arrangement that was subsequently found to be inconvenient. The house provided living and sleeping accommodation over three storeys, with attics and a basement. The Norfolk countryside surrounding the house appealed to Alexandra, as it reminded her of her native Denmark.

Within a decade, the house was again found to be too small, and in 1883 a new extension, the Bachelors' Wing, was constructed to the designs of a Norfolk architect, Colonel R. W. Edis. Edis also built a new billiard room and converted the old conservatory into a bowling alley. The Prince of Wales had been impressed by one he had seen at Trentham Hall, and the alley at Sandringham was modelled on an example from Rumpenheim Castle, Germany. In 1891, during preparations for Edward's fiftieth birthday, a serious fire broke out when maids lit all the fires in the second-floor bedrooms to warm them in advance of the prince's arrival. Edis was recalled to undertake rebuilding and further construction. As he had with the Bachelors' Wing, Edis tried to harmonise these additions with Humbert's house by following the original Jacobethan style, and by using matching brickwork and Ketton stone.

The house was up to date in its facilities, the modern kitchens and lighting running on gas from the estate's own plant and water being supplied from the Appleton Water Tower, constructed at the highest point on the estate. The tower was designed in an Italianate style by Robert Rawlinson, and Alexandra laid the foundation stone in 1877. The Prince's efforts as a country gentleman were approved by the press of the day; a contemporary newspaper expressed a wish to "Sandringhamize Marlborough House—as a landlord, agriculturist and country gentleman, the Prince sets an example which might be followed with advantage".

The royal couple's developments at Sandringham were not confined to the house; over the course of their occupation, the wider estate was also transformed. Ornamental and kitchen gardens were established, employing over 100 gardeners at their peak. Many estate buildings were constructed, including cottages for staff, kennels, a school, a rectory and a staff clubhouse, the Babingley. Edward also made Sandringham one of the best sporting estates in England to provide a setting for the elaborate weekend shooting parties that became Sandringham's defining rationale. To increase the amount of daylight available during the shooting season, which ran from October to February, the prince introduced the tradition of Sandringham Time, whereby all the clocks on the estate were set half an hour ahead of GMT. This tradition was maintained until 1936. Edward's entertaining was legendary, and the scale of the slaughter of game birds, predominantly pheasants and partridges, was colossal. The meticulously maintained game books recorded annual bags of between 6,000 and 8,000 birds in the 1870s, rising to bags of over 20,000 a year by 1900. The game larder, constructed for the storage of the carcasses, was inspired by that at Holkham Hall and was the largest in Europe.  

Guests for Sandringham house parties generally arrived at Wolferton railway station, 2.5 miles from the house, travelling in royal trains that ran from St Pancras Station to King's Lynn and then on to Wolferton. The station served the house from 1862 until its closure in 1969. Thereafter, the Queen and others staying at the house have generally travelled by car from King's Lynn. Edward VII established the Sandringham stud in 1897, achieving considerable success with the racehorses Persimmon and Diamond Jubilee. Neither his son nor his grandsons evinced as much interest in horses, although the stud was maintained; but his great-granddaughter, Elizabeth II, tried to match Edward's equestrian achievements and bred several winners at the Sandringham Stud.

On 14 January 1892, Edward's eldest son and heir, Prince Albert Victor, Duke of Clarence and Avondale, died of pneumonia at the house. He is commemorated in the clock tower, which bears an inscription in Latin that translates as "the hours perish and will be charged to our account".

George V
In his will Edward VII left his widow £200,000 and a lifetime interest in the Sandringham estate. Queen Alexandra's continued occupancy of the "big house" compelled George V, his wife, Queen Mary, and their expanding family to remain at York Cottage in the grounds, in rather "cramped" conditions. Suggestions from courtiers that Queen Alexandra might move out were firmly rebuffed by the King; "It is my mother's house, my father built it for her". The King also lacked the sociability of his father, and the shortage of space at York Cottage enabled him to limit the entertaining he undertook, with the small rooms reportedly reminding him of the onboard cabins of his naval career.

The new King's primary interests, aside from his constitutional duties, were shooting and stamp collecting. He was considered one of the best shots in England, and his collections of shotguns and stamps were among the finest in the world. Deeply conservative by nature, George sought to maintain the traditions of Sandringham estate life established by his father, and life at York Cottage provided respite from the constitutional and political struggles that overshadowed the early years of George's reign. Even greater upheaval was occasioned by the outbreak of the First World War, a dynastic struggle that involved many of his relatives, including the German Kaiser and the Russian Emperor, both of whom had previously been guests at Sandringham. The estate and village of Sandringham suffered a major loss when all but two members of the King's Own Sandringham Company, a territorial unit of the Fifth Battalion of the Royal Norfolk Regiment, were killed at Suvla Bay during the Gallipoli Campaign. The story of the battalion was the subject of a BBC drama, All the King's Men. A memorial to the dead was raised on the estate; the names of those killed in the Second World War were added subsequently.

Following Queen Alexandra's death at Sandringham on 20 November 1925, the King and his family moved to the main house. In 1932, George V gave the first of the royal Christmas messages from a studio erected at Sandringham. The speech, written by Rudyard Kipling, began, "I speak now from my home and from my heart to you all". George V died in his bedroom at Sandringham at 11:55 p.m. on 20 January 1936, his death hastened by injections of morphine and cocaine, to maintain the King's dignity and to enable the announcement of his death to be made in the following day's Times. The King's body was moved to St Mary Magdalene's Church, a scene described by the late King's assistant private secretary, "Tommy" Lascelles. "Next evening we took him over to the little church at the end of the garden. We saw the lych-gate brilliantly lit [and] the guardsmen slung the coffin on their shoulders and laid it before the altar. After a brief service, we left it, to be watched over by the men of the Sandringham Estate." Two days later, George's body was transported by train from Wolferton to London, and to its lying in state at Westminster Hall.

Edward VIII
On the night of his father's death, Edward VIII summarily ordered that the clocks at Sandringham be returned to Greenwich Mean Time, ending the tradition of Sandringham time begun by his grandfather over 50 years earlier. Edward had rarely enjoyed his visits to Sandringham, either in his father's time or that of his grandfather. He described a typical dinner at the house in a letter to his then mistress Freda Dudley Ward, dated 26 December 1919; "it's too dull and boring for words. Christ how any human beings can ever have got themselves into this pompous secluded and monotonous groove I just can't imagine". In another letter, evenings at the "big house"—Edward stayed at York Cottage with his father—were recorded as "sordidly dull and boring". His antipathy to the house was unlikely to have been lessened by his late father's will, which was read to the family in the saloon at the house. His brothers were each left £750,000 while Edward was bequeathed no monetary assets beyond the revenues from the Duchy of Cornwall. A codicil also prevented him from selling the late King's personal possessions; Lascelles described the inheritance as "the Kingship without the cash".

Edward's concerns regarding his income led him immediately to focus on the expense associated with running his late father's private homes. Sandringham he described as a "voracious white elephant", and he asked his brother, the Duke of York to undertake a review of the management of the estate, which had been costing his father £50,000 annually in subsidies at the time of his death. The review recommended significant retrenchments, and its partial implementation caused considerable resentment among the dismissed staff. After the night of his father's death at Sandringham, Edward spent only one further night of his reign at the house, bringing Wallis Simpson for a shooting party in October 1936. The party was interrupted by a request to meet with prime minister Stanley Baldwin, and having arrived on a Sunday, the King returned to Fort Belvedere the next day. He never returned to Sandringham; and, his attention diverted by the impending crisis arising from his attachment to Simpson, within two months of his only visit to the house as king, he had abdicated. On his abdication, as Sandringham and Balmoral Castle were the private property of the monarch, it was necessary for King George VI to purchase both properties. The price paid, £300,000, was a cause of friction between the new King and his brother.

George VI

George VI had been born at Sandringham on 14 December 1895. A keen follower of country pursuits, he was as devoted to the estate as his father, writing to his mother, Queen Mary, "I have always been so happy here". The deep retrenchment he had proposed when commissioned by his brother to review the estate was not enacted, but economies were still made. His mother was at church at Sandringham on Sunday 3 September 1939, when the outbreak of the Second World War was declared. The house was shut up during the war, but occasional visits were made to the estate, with the family staying at outlying cottages. After the war the King made improvements to the gardens surrounding the house but, as traditionalist as his father, he made few other changes. December 1945 saw the first celebration of Christmas at the house since 1938. Lady Airlie recorded her impressions at dinner: "I sat next to the King. His face was tired and strained and he ate practically nothing. Looking at him I felt the cold fear of the probability of another short reign".

George was a heavy smoker throughout his life and had an operation to remove part of his lung in September 1951. He was never fully well again and died at Sandringham during the early morning of 6 February 1952. He had gone out after hares on 5 February, "shooting conspicuously well", and had planned the next day's shoot before retiring at 10.30 p.m. He was discovered at 7.30 a.m. in his bedroom by his valet, having died of a coronary thrombosis at the age of 56. His body was placed in the Church of St Mary Magdalene, before being taken to Wolferton Station and transported by train to London, to lie in state at Westminster Hall.

Elizabeth II
As with her predecessors, the house remained one of the two homes owned by the Sovereign in her private capacity, rather than as head of state, the other being Balmoral Castle. Following King George VI's death, Queen Elizabeth II's custom was to spend the anniversary of that and of her own accession privately with her family at Sandringham House, and, more recently, to use it as her official base from Christmas until February. In celebrating Christmas at Sandringham, the Queen followed the tradition of her last three predecessors, whereas her great-great-grandmother, Queen Victoria, held her celebrations at Windsor Castle. The taxation arrangements of the monarch meant that no inheritance tax was paid on the Sandringham or Balmoral estates when they passed to the Queen, at a time when it was having a deleterious effect on other country estates. On her accession, the Queen asked her husband, the Duke of Edinburgh, to take on the responsibility for the management of the estate. The Duke worked to move towards self-sufficiency, generating additional income streams, taking more of the land in hand, and amalgamating many of the smaller tenant farms.

 
In January 1957 the Queen received the resignation of the Prime Minister Anthony Eden at the house. Eden's wife, Clarissa, recorded the event in her diary, "8 January – Anthony has to go through a Cabinet and listening to Harold prosing for half an hour. Then by train to Sandringham. Many photographers. We arrive into the hall where everyone is looking at the television." At the end of that year, the Queen made her first televised Christmas broadcast from Sandringham. In the 1960s, plans were initiated to demolish the house and replace it with a modern residence by David Roberts, an architect who worked mainly at the University of Cambridge. The plans were not taken forward, but modernisation of the interior of the house and the removal of a range of ancillary buildings were carried out by Hugh Casson, who also decorated the Royal Yacht, Britannia. In 1977, for her silver jubilee, the Queen opened the house to the public.

Sandringham continued to operate as a sporting estate. Pheasants and partridge are no longer reared for this purpose, and Sandringham is now one of the few wild shoots in England. Along with her equestrian interest in the Sandringham Stud, where she bred several winning horses, the Queen developed a successful gun dog breeding programme at Sandringham. Following the tradition of a kennels at Sandringham established by her great grandfather, when Queen Alexandra kept over 100 dogs on the estate, the Queen preferred black labrador retrievers, over the yellow type favoured by her father, and the terriers bred by her earlier predecessors.

From his retirement from official duties in August 2017 until his death in April 2021, the Duke of Edinburgh spent much of his time at Wood Farm, a large farmhouse on the Sandringham Estate used by the Duke and the Queen when not hosting guests at the main house. In February 2022 the Queen celebrated the 70th anniversary of her accession at Sandringham. The Queen made her last visit to Sandringham in early July 2022, for five days after completing her Platinum Jubilee celebrations.

Charles III
On the death of his mother, the Sandringham estate passed to King Charles. In November 2022, Buckingham Palace confirmed that the King planned to spend Christmas at Sandringham, continuing the tradition followed by Elizabeth II until 2020.

Architecture and description

The house is mainly constructed of red brick with limestone dressings; Norfolk Carrstone is also prevalent, particularly in Edis's additions. The tiled roof contains nine separate clusters of chimneystacks. The style is Jacobethan, with inspiration drawn principally from nearby Blickling Hall. Construction was undertaken by Goggs Brothers of Swaffham. The principal rooms of the house are the saloon, the drawing room, the dining room and the ballroom, together with rooms devoted to sports, such as the gun room, or leisure, such as the bowling alley, now a library, and the billiard room. The walls of the corridors connecting the principal rooms display a collection of Oriental and Indian arms and armour, gathered by Edward VII on his tour of the East in 1875–1876. Decoration of the house and the provision of furniture and fittings was undertaken by Holland and Sons in the 1870 rebuilding.

Saloon
The largest room in the house, the saloon is used as the main reception room. The arrangement of entry under the porte-cochère direct into the saloon proved problematic, with no ante-room in which guests could remove their hats and coats. Jenkins describes the decorative style, here and elsewhere in the house, as "Osbert Lancaster's Curzon Street Baroque". The room contains portraits of Queen Victoria and Prince Albert by their favourite artist Franz Xaver Winterhalter. The saloon functioned as a venue for dances, until the construction of the new ballroom by Edis, and has a minstrels' gallery to accommodate musicians. The room contains a weighing machine; Edward VII was in the habit of requiring his guests to be weighed on their arrival, and again on their departure, to establish that his lavish hospitality had caused them to put on weight.

Drawing room
The drawing room is described by Jenkins as "the nearest Sandringham gets to pomp". On one of her two visits to the house, Victoria recorded in her journal that, after dinner, the party adjourned to "the very long and handsome drawing room with painted ceiling and two fireplaces". The room contains portraits of Queen Alexandra and her daughters, Princess Louise, Princess Victoria, and Princess Maud of Wales, by Edward Hughes. White marble statues complete what has been described as a "tour de force of fashionable late-Victorian decoration".

Ballroom
The ballroom was added by Edis in 1884, to overcome the inconvenience of having only the saloon as the major room for entertaining. As this was also the main family living room, it had previously been necessary to remove the furniture when the saloon was required for dances and large entertainments. Alexandra recorded her delight at the result, "Our new ballroom is beautiful I think & a great success & avoids pulling the hall to pieces each time there is a ball or anything". At the time of Queen Victoria's visit in 1889, the room was used for a theatrical performance given by Sir Henry Irving and Ellen Terry. Queen Elizabeth II used the room for entertainments and as a cinema.

Dining room

The walls of the dining room are decorated with Spanish tapestries including some by Goya which were a gift from Alfonso XII of Spain. The walls are panelled in oak, painted light green for Queen Mary who had been inspired by a visit to a Scottish castle. Jill Franklin's study of the planning of Victorian country houses includes a photograph of the dining room at Sandringham with the table laid for dinner for twenty-four, a "very usual" number to seat for dinner in a major country house of the time.

Appreciation
Sandringham House has not been admired by critics. Its chief fault is the lack of harmony between Humbert's original building and Edis's extensions, "a contrast between the northern and southern halves of the house (that) has been much criticised ever since". The architectural historian John Martin Robinson wrote in 1982, "Sandringham, the latest in date of the houses of the British monarchy, is the least distinguished architecturally". In his biography of Queen Mary, James Pope-Hennessy compared the house unfavourably to "a golf-hotel at St Andrews or a station-hotel at Strathpeffer". Simon Jenkins considered Sandringham "unattractive", with a "grim, institutional appearance". Pevsner described the architectural style as "frenetic"; Girouard expressed himself perplexed as to the preference shown by the royal family for A. J. Humbert, a patronage the writer Adrian Tinniswood described as "the Victorian Royal Family's knack for choosing second-rate architects". An article on the house in the June 1902 edition of Country Life opined, "of mere splendour there is not much, but of substantial comfort a good deal". The writer Clive Aslet suggests that the sporting opportunities offered by the estate were the main attraction for its royal owners, rather than "the house itself, which even after rebuilding was never beguiling".

The fittings and furnishings were also criticised; the biographer of George V, Kenneth Rose, wrote that, "except for some tapestries given by Alfonso XII, Sandringham had not a single good picture, piece of furniture or other work of art". Neither Edward VII nor his heir were noted for their artistic appreciation; writing of the redevelopments at Buckingham Palace undertaken by George V, and previously by Edward VII, John Martin Robinson wrote that, "the King had no more aesthetic sensibility than his father and expressed impatience with his wife's keen interest in furniture and decoration". In the series of articles on the house and estate published in 1902 by Country Life to celebrate Edward VII's accession, the author noted the royal family's "set policy of preferring those pictures that have associations to those which have merely artistic merit". Exceptions came to include works from the collection of mainly 20th-century English art assembled by the Queen Mother, including pieces by Edward Seago and John Piper, who produced a view of Sandringham.

 John Piper's sombre palette did not always find favour with Queen Elizabeth or her husband, George VI remarking, "You seem to have very bad luck with your weather, Mr Piper". The house also has an extensive holding of works by Fabergé, the world's largest, assembled by Queen Alexandra and later members of the family, which includes representations of farm animals from the Sandringham estate commissioned by Edward VII as presents for his wife.

Although not highly regarded as architecture, Sandringham is a rare extant example of a full-scale Victorian country house, described in the magazine Country Life as "lived in and beautifully maintained, complete with its original contents, gardens and dependent estate buildings". The house, the landscaped gardens, park and woodlands are listed Grade II* on the Register of Historic Parks and Gardens, Grade II* being the second-highest listing, reserved for "particularly important buildings of more than special interest".

Gardens

They were predominantly laid out from the 1860s, with later alterations and simplifications. Edward VII sought advice from William Broderick Thomas and Ferdinand de Rothschild, a friend and adviser to the King throughout his life. The original lake was filled and replaced with the elaborate parterres fashionable at the time. These have since been removed. Two new lakes were dug further from the house, and bordered by rockeries constructed of Pulhamite stone. A summerhouse, called The Nest, stands above the Upper Lake, a gift in 1913 to Queen Alexandra from the comptroller of her household, General Sir Dighton Probyn. The gardens to the north of the house, which are overlooked by the suite of rooms used by George VI, were remodelled and simplified by Geoffrey Jellicoe for the King and his wife after the Second World War. A statue of Father Time, dating from the 18th century, was purchased by the Queen Mother and installed in 1951. Further areas of the gardens were remodelled by Sir Eric Savill in the 1960s for Queen Elizabeth and Prince Philip. The extensive kitchen gardens, which in Edward VII's time included carriage drives to allow guests to view the "highly ornamental" arrangements, were also laid to lawn during Queen Elizabeth II's reign, having proved uneconomic to maintain.

Wider estate

The 20,000 acre (8,100 ha) Sandringham estate has some of the finest shoots in England, and is used for royal shooting parties. Covering seven villages, the estate's other main activities, aside from tourism, are arable crops and forestry. The grounds provided room for Queen Alexandra's menagerie of horses, dogs, cats, and other animals. In 1886 a racing pigeon loft was constructed for birds given to the Duke of York by King Leopold II of Belgium and one or more lofts for pigeons have been maintained ever since. The Norwich Gates, designed by Thomas Jeckyll and made by the local firm of Barnard, Bishop and Barnard, were a wedding present for Edward and Alexandra from "the gentry of Norfolk".

In 2007 Sandringham House and its grounds were designated a protected site under Section 128 of the Serious Organised Crime and Police Act 2005. This makes it a criminal offence to trespass in the house or its grounds. The Sandringham estate has a museum in the former coach house with displays of royal life and estate history. The museum also houses an extensive collection of royal motor vehicles including a 1900 Daimler owned by Edward VII and a 1939 Merryweather & Sons fire engine, made for the Sandringham fire brigade which was founded in 1865 and operated independently on the estate until 1968. The coach house stables and garaging were designed by A. J. Humbert at the same time as his construction of the main house. The estate contains several houses with close links to the royal family.

Anmer Hall

Anmer Hall is a Georgian house on the grounds, purchased by the Prince of Wales in 1896. Formerly occupied by the Duke of Kent, it was the main country home of the Prince and Princess of Wales, until their move to Adelaide Cottage at Windsor.

Appleton House
When Prince Carl of Denmark (later King Haakon VII of Norway) and Princess Maud were married in July 1896, Appleton House was a wedding gift to them from the bride's parents, the Prince and Princess of Wales. Queen Maud became fond of Appleton, "our little house is a perfect paradise", and their son, Prince Alexander (the future King Olav V of Norway), was born at the house in 1903. After Queen Maud died in 1938, King Haakon returned the property. The last inhabitants were King George VI and Queen Elizabeth who stayed there during a visit to Norfolk during World War II, when Sandringham was closed. Lascelles considered it "an ugly villa, but not uncomfortable". The house was demolished in 1984.

Park House
Constructed by Edward VII, Park House has been owned by the royal family for many years. The birthplace of Diana, Princess of Wales, when the house was let to her father, it was subsequently run as a hotel managed by the Leonard Cheshire charity. In 2019, the charity developed plans for a £2.3m refurbishment programme, which were deferred because of the 2020 COVID-19 pandemic. The charity has since decided to discontinue the redevelopment and work with the Sandringham Estate to exit the lease.

Wood Farm

Wood Farm has been part of the Sandringham Estate since the time of Edward VII. In the early 20th century, it was home to Prince John, the youngest of the six children of King George V and Queen Mary. Born in 1905, the Prince was epileptic, and spent much of his short life in relative seclusion at Sandringham. He died at Wood Farm, his home for the last two years of his life, on 18 January 1919. Prince Philip, Duke of Edinburgh, lived at Wood Farm after retiring from royal duties.

York Cottage

York Cottage, originally known as Bachelors' Cottage, was built by Edward, Prince of Wales, soon after he acquired Sandringham to provide further accommodation for guests. It was home to George V from 1893 until his mother's death enabled him to move into the main house in 1925. Edward VIII, by then Duke of Windsor, told his father's biographer Harold Nicolson, "Until you have seen York Cottage you will never understand my father". The cottage was no more highly regarded architecturally than the main house; James Pope-Hennessy, the official biographer of Queen Mary, called it, "tremendously vulgar and emphatically, almost defiantly hideous". Nicolson described it as a "glum little villa (with) rooms indistinguishable from those of any Surbiton or Upper Norwood home". He was particularly dismissive of the royal bathing arrangements: "Oh my God! what a place. The King's and Queen's baths had lids that shut down so that when not in use they could be used as tables". "It is almost incredible that the heir to so vast a heritage lived in this horrible little house." Nicolson's strictures did not appear in his official biography of the King. York Cottage is currently the estate office for the Sandringham Estate.

Public access
The country park and the visitors' centre are normally open throughout the year. The house, gardens and museum were usually opened annually from the end of March until the end of October, but COVID-19 led to the closure of much of the estate. Staged re-opening took place from February 2022. Following the death of Elizabeth II, Sandringham was closed for a period of official mourning. The country park has subsequently reopened but the house and gardens will remain closed to the public until April 2023.

See also
 St Mary Magdalene Church, Sandringham

Notes

References

Bibliography

External links

 Sandringham Estate website
 Sandringham House entry from The DiCamillo Companion to British & Irish Country Houses
 Sandringham House entry from the English Monarchs website
 Recording of King George V giving the first Royal Christmas Message from Sandringham in 1932
 Pathé News footage of the transportation of the coffin of George V to Wolferton Station at the start of its journey to London

Carriage museums in England
Country houses in Norfolk
Grade II* listed parks and gardens in Norfolk
Historic house museums in Norfolk
Houses completed in 1870
Gardens in Norfolk
Jacobethan architecture
Royal residences in England
Transport museums in England
1870 establishments in England
Sandringham, Norfolk
Grade II* listed buildings in Norfolk
Gardens by Geoffrey Jellicoe